Alien Terminator is a 1995 American horror film, written and directed by Dave Payne. It stars Cassandra Leigh and Maria Ford. It was also released on video as Alien Species.

Plot

Under the project called Bio-com, the Earthtek corporation has locked 6 scientists in an deep underground vault to study the effects of isolation. The experiment has been ongoing for almost two years.

Unknown to everyone except one of the scientists, the fake isolation experiment hides Earthtek's real purpose, to use drug(s) to create super-soldiers.

A creature escapes the lab and kills a muse and the base's cat. The creature can take over the body of whatever it inhabits.

Cast 
 Lisa Boyle (Cassandra Leigh) as Rachel
 Maria Ford as McKay
 Rodger Halston as Dean Taylor
 Emile Levisetti as Pete
 Kevin Alber as Dr Newton Fuller
 Bob McFarland as a coach
 Betsy Baldwin as Kelly Hill, a reporter

References

External links
 

1990s English-language films
1995 films
1995 horror films
American science fiction horror films
1990s science fiction horror films
Films scored by Christopher Lennertz
Films directed by Dave Payne
1990s American films